The University of Perpignan  is a French university, located in Perpignan.

History 

The first university of Perpignan was established in 1349 by King Peter IV of Aragon. It is one of the oldest regional universities, following in the steps of more renowned centers of learning, such as the far more influential University of Toulouse and University of Montpellier.

Peter IV, having conquered in 1344 the town of Perpignan and reunited to his estates the Kingdom of Majorca, of which Perpignan became its capital, compensated that city for its loss of power by founding, at the request of the magistrates, 20 March 1349, the University of Perpignan, for the teaching of civil and canon law, and other arts and sciences. In the charter he praised "the deep learning of the professors of Perpignan".

By the Bull of 28 November 1379, the antipope Clement VII confirmed the foundation and privileges, and the university, in a petition addressed to him in 1393, declared him its founder: "Pater et Genitor". In 1381 John I of Aragon, son of Peter IV, granted permission to the city authorities to build the university near the royal castle. The institution spread in Perpignan an atmosphere of learning, the study of law being specially developed. Theology was taught there during the first years of the fourteenth century, but it was not until 21 July 1447, that the faculty of theology was created by a Bull of Pope Nicholas V and it did not receive its statutes until 1459.

The university of Perpignan was closed for two centuries between 1794 and 1971. A new University Center was established in Perpignan and in 1979 the University became autonomous financially, administratively and educationally.

Organisation
The university is composed of four Faculties:
 Faculty of Pure and Experimental Science
 Faculty of Law and Economics
 Faculty of Letters and Human Sciences
 Faculty of Sports and Physical Activities

and three institutes:
 University Institute of Technology
 Institute of Business Administration
 Institute of Franco-Catalan Studies

Notable people

Faculty
 Claude Combes (born 1935, in Perpignan) - biologist and parasitologist
 Jean Meyer (born 1942, in Nice) - historian
 Jean-Marcel Goger (born 1954 in Nancy, France) - historian
 Jacqueline Assaël (born 1957, Marseille) - Hellenist, essayist and poet
 Christophe Euzet (born 1967) - politician LREM
 Pere Aragonès (born 1982) - Catalan lawyer and politician; President of the Government of Catalonia

Alumni
 Lídia Armengol i Vila (1948 – 1991) - historian and civil servant Andorra
 Jeannie Mah (born 1952, in Regina, Saskatchewan) - Canadian ceramic artist
 Chadi Massaad (born 1959, in Lebanon) - architect
 Chafik Rachadi (born 1963, in Marrakech, Morocco) - politician.
 Asmaa Rhlalou - Moroccan journalist and politician
 Nicolas Lebourg (born 1979) - historian
 Nsah Mala (born 1988), writer and poet Cameroon

Recipient of honorary degree
 Predrag Matvejević (1932 – 2017) - Bosnian and Croatian writer and scholar

See also
 List of medieval universities
 List of public universities in France by academy

Notes

Attribution

External links
Official site 

Educational institutions established in the 14th century
University of Perpignan Via Domitia
Educational institutions established in 1979
Universities and colleges in Perpignan
1979 establishments in France
1349 establishments in Europe
1340s establishments in France